Hippotion saclavorum is a moth of the family Sphingidae. It is known from Madagascar, In the town of Ambinanindrano, 50km west of Mahanoro. 

The length of the forewings is about 23 mm. This is a small, brown species which is similar to Hippotion balsaminae but with shorter and more rounded forewings. The abdomen upperside has dorsal and subdorsal longitudinal lines which are only very weakly indicated. The forewing upperside has a full complement of postmedian lines, of which the fifth is the heaviest, the sixth the next heaviest and the first to fourth equally narrow and inconspicuous. The hindwing upperside is dark brown with the pale brown median band clearly visible only near the tornus.

References

 Pinhey, E. (1962): Hawk Moths of Central and Southern Africa. Longmans Southern Africa, Cape Town.

Hippotion
Moths described in 1933
Moths of Madagascar
Moths of Africa